The FIS Nordic Junior World Ski Championships 2005 took place in Rovaniemi, Finland from 21 March to 26 March 2005. It was the 28th Junior World Championships in nordic skiing.

Schedule
All times are in local time (UTC+2).

Cross-country

Nordic combined

Ski jumping

Medal summary

Junior events

Cross-country skiing

Nordic Combined

Ski jumping

Medal table

References 

2005
2005 in cross-country skiing
2005 in ski jumping
Junior World Ski Championships
2005 in youth sport
International sports competitions hosted by Finland